Tayasu Tsuyoshi (Japanese: タヤスツヨシ, foaled  April 26th, 1992) is a Japanese Thoroughbred racehorse and the winner of the 1995 Tokyo Yūshun.

Career

Tayasu Tsyoshi's first race was on August 7th, 1994, at Sapporo, where he came in 3rd.

He picked up his first win on September 25th, 1994, at Chukyo Racecourse. He then won the Erika Sho on December 3rd, 1994.

He won the biggest race of his career, by winning the 1994  Hopeful Stakes. He had a good showing at the 1995 Satsuki Shō, coming in 2nd. Then he won the biggest race of his career by winning the 1995 Tokyo Yūshun on May 28th.

He finished out his career quietly in 1995 with 5th and 7th place finishes at the Kobe Shimbun Hai and the Kyoto Shimbun Hai. His final race was on November 5th, 1995 at the Kikuka-shō, where he came in 6th. He developed tendonitis after and was officially retired on July 27th, 1996.

Stud career
Tayasu Tsuyoshi's descendants include:

c = colt, f = filly

Pedigree

References

1992 racehorse births